Fishing River Township is an inactive township in Clay County, in the U.S. state of Missouri.

Fishing River Township was established in 1821, taking its name from the Fishing River.

References

Townships in Missouri
Townships in Clay County, Missouri